Marcel Allain (15 September 1885 – 25 August 1969) was a French writer mostly remembered today for his co-creation with Pierre Souvestre of the fictional arch-villain and master criminal Fantômas.

Career 
The son of a bourgeois family, Allain studied law before becoming a journalist. He then became the assistant of Souvestre, who was already a well-known figure in literary circles. In 1909, the two men published their first novel, Le Rour. Investigating Magistrate Germain Fuselier, later to become a recurring character in the Fantômas series, appears in the novel.

Then, in February 1911, Allain and Souvestre embarked upon the Fantômas book series at the request of publisher Arthème Fayard, who wanted to create a new monthly pulp magazine. The success was immediate and lasting.

After Souvestre’s death in February 1914, Allain continued the Fantômas saga alone, then launched several other series, such as Tigris, Fatala, Miss Téria and Férocias, but none garnered the same popularity as Fantômas. In total, Allain wrote more than 400 novels in his prolific career.

On 27 September 1926, Allain married Souvestre’s girl-friend, Henriette Kistler. She died in 1956.

Other work by Allain and Souvestre 
 Le Rour (1908)

Bibliography of the Fantômas books

By Allain and Souvestre
1911
 1. Fantômas (1911; transl. 1915; retransl. 1986)
 2. Juve contre Fantômas (1911; transl. 1916; retransl. 1987)
 3. Le Mort qui Tue (1911; transl. 1917)
 4. L'Agent Secret (1911; transl. 1917)
 5. Un Roi Prisonnier de Fantômas (1911; transl. 1919)
 6. Le Policier Apache (1911; transl. 1924)
 7. Le Pendu de Londres (1911; transl. 1920)
 8. La Fille de Fantômas (1911; transl. 2006)
 9. Le Fiacre de Nuit (1911)
 10. La Main Coupée (1911; transl. 1924)
1912
 11. L'Arrestation de Fantômas (1912)
 13. La Livrée du Crime (1912)
 14. La Mort de Juve (1912)
 15. L'Evadée de Saint-Lazare (1912)
 16. La Disparition de Fandor (1912)
 17. Le Mariage de Fantômas (1912)
 18. L'Assassin de Lady Beltham (1912)
 19. La Guêpe Rouge (1912)
 20. Les Souliers du Mort (1912)
 21. Le Train Perdu (1912)
 22. Les Amours d'un Prince (1912)
 23. Le Bouquet Tragique (1912)
1913
 24. Le Jockey Masqué (1913)
 25. Le Cercueil Vide (1913)
 26. Le Faiseur de Reines (1913)
 27. Le Cadavre Géant (1913)
 28. Le Voleur d'Or (1913)
 29. La Série Rouge (1913)
 30. L'Hôtel du Crime (1913)
 31. La Cravate de Chanvre (1913)
 32. La Fin de Fantômas (1913)

By Allain alone
 33. Fantômas est-il ressuscité? (1925; transl. 1925) 
 34. Fantômas, Roi des Recéleurs (1926; transl. 1926) 
 35. Fantômas en Danger (1926; transl. 1926)
 36. Fantômas prend sa Revanche (1926; transl. 1927)
 37. Fantômas Attaque Fandor (1926; transl. 1928)
 38. Si c'était Fantômas? (1933)
 39. Oui, c'est Fantômas!  (1934)
 40. Fantômas Joue et Gagne (1935)
 41. Fantômas Rencontre l'Amour (1946)
 42. Fantômas Vole des Blondes (1948)
 43. Fantômas Mène le Bal (1963)

References

External links

 
 
 

1885 births
1969 deaths
Writers from Paris
20th-century French novelists
20th-century French male writers
French crime fiction writers
French fantasy writers
French male novelists
French male non-fiction writers
20th-century French journalists